A rift is a geological structure.

Rift(s) or The Rift may also refer to:

Film and television
 The Rift (1990 film), a film directed by Juan Piquer Simón
 Rift (film), a 2019 Nigerian film directed by Biodun Stephen
 Cardiff Rift or The Rift, a fictional wormhole in the Doctor Who universe

Games
 Rift (video game), a 2011 massively multiplayer online role-playing game
 Rifts (role-playing game), 1990 multi-genre role-playing game created by Kevin Siembieda
 Rifts: Promise of Power, a 2005 video game
 Far Gate, development title The Rift, a 2001 computer game

Literature
 The Rift (Allan novel), a 2017 novel by Nina Allan
 The Rift (Williams novel), a 1999 novel by Walter Jon Williams
 The Rift (Star Trek), a 1991 novel by Peter David
 Avatar: The Last Airbender – The Rift, a 2014 graphic novel

Music
 Rift (album), a 1993 album by Phish
 "Rift", a song by Northlane from the 2019 album Alien
 Rifts (album), a 2009 album by Oneohtrix Point Never

Other uses
 Rift, West Virginia, US, an unincorporated community
 Oculus Rift, a virtual reality head-mounted display
 Reactor-In-Flight-Test, a planned phase of the NERVA rocket engine development program

See also
 Great Rift Valley (disambiguation)
 Rift valley (disambiguation)